Moline Plows may refer to:

 Moline Plow Company
 Moline Plowboys minor-league baseball team